Endonuclease VIII-like 1 is an enzyme that in humans is encoded by the NEIL1 gene.

NEIL1 belongs to a class of DNA glycosylases homologous to the bacterial Fpg/Nei family. These glycosylases initiate the first step in base excision repair by cleaving bases damaged by reactive oxygen species (ROS) and introducing a DNA strand break via the associated lyase reaction.

Targets 

NEIL1 recognizes (targets) and removes certain ROS-damaged bases and then incises the abasic site via β,δ elimination, leaving 3′ and 5′ phosphate ends. NEIL1 recognizes oxidized pyrimidines, formamidopyrimidines, thymine residues oxidized at the methyl group, and both stereoisomers of thymine glycol.  The best substrates for human NEIL1 appear to be the hydantoin lesions, guanidinohydantoin, and spiroiminodihydantoin that are further oxidation products of 8-oxoG.  NEIL1 is also capable of removing lesions from single-stranded DNA as well as from bubble and forked DNA structures.  Because the expression of NEIL1 is cell-cycle dependent, and because it acts on forked DNA structures and interacts with PCNA and FEN-1, it has been proposed that NEIL1 functions in replication associated DNA repair.

Deficiency in cancer 

NEIL1 is one of the DNA repair genes most frequently hypermethylated in head and neck squamous cell carcinoma (HNSCC).  When 160 human DNA repair genes were evaluated for aberrant methylation in HNSCC tumors, 62% of tumors were hypermethylated in the NEIL1 promoter region, causing NEIL1 messenger RNA and NEIL1 protein to be repressed.  When 8 DNA repair genes were evaluated in non-small cell lung cancer (NSCLC) tumors, 42% were hypermethylated in the NEIL1 promoter region.  This was the most frequent DNA repair deficiency found among the 8 DNA repair genes tested. NEIL1 was also one of six DNA repair genes found to be hypermethylated in their promoter regions in colorectal cancer.

While other DNA repair genes, such as MGMT and MLH1, are often evaluated for epigenetic repression in many types of cancer, epigenetic deficiency of NEIL1 is usually not evaluated, but might be of importance in such cancers as well.

DNA damage appears to be the primary underlying cause of cancer.  If DNA repair is deficient, DNA damage tends to accumulate. Such excess DNA damage may increase mutational errors during DNA replication due to error-prone translesion synthesis. Excess DNA damage may also increase epigenetic alterations due to errors during DNA repair. Such mutations and epigenetic alterations may give rise to cancer (see malignant neoplasms).

In colon cancer, germ line mutations in DNA repair genes cause only 2–5% of cases. However, methylation of the promoter region of DNA repair genes (including NEIL1), are frequently associated with colon cancers and may be an important causal factor for these cancers.

Memory retention

NEIL1 promotes short-term spatial memory retention.  Mice lacking NEIL1 have impaired memory retention in a water maze test.

Stroke prevention

NEIL1 also protects against ischemic stroke-induced brain dysfunction and death in mice.  NEIL1 deficiency causes brain damage and a functionally defective outcome in a mouse model of stroke.

References

Further reading 

 
 
 
 
 
 
 
 
 
 
 
 
 
 
 
 

Human proteins